Harry Alfred "Fred" Khasigian is a former American football player, rugby coach, and orthopedic surgeon. He played at the offensive guard position for the USC Trojans football team from 1967 to 1969. He was a first-team guard on the All-Pacific Coast football teams in 1968 and 1969. He was also a National Football Foundation National Scholar Athlete in 1969. He later became an orthopedic surgeon and also coached high school rugby. Six of his high school rugby teams won national championships. He was also inducted into the Armenian American Sports Hall of Fame.

References

Living people
American football guards
USC Trojans football players
Players of American football from California
United States international rugby union players
Year of birth missing (living people)